Say It Loud! is an album by jazz saxophonist Lou Donaldson recorded for the Blue Note label in 1968 and featuring Donaldson with Blue Mitchell, Charles Earland, Jimmy Ponder, and Leo Morris.

Reception
The album was awarded 1½ stars in an Allmusic review by Stephen Thomas Erlewine who states "his group sounds awkward and uneasy. There are a few good moments scattered throughout the album, particularly by Mitchell, but overall, Say It Loud! is one of the weakest records in Donaldson's catalog". The album featured Donaldson utilising the varitone amplification system for saxophone.

Track listing
All compositions by Lou Donaldson except as indicated
 "Say It Loud (I'm Black and I'm Proud)" (James Brown, Pee Wee Ellis) - 7:32
 "Summertime" (George Gershwin, Ira Gershwin, DuBose Heyward) - 5:49
 "Caravan" (Duke Ellington, Irving Mills, Juan Tizol) - 5:22
 "Snake Bone" - 9:31
 "Brother Soul" (Donaldson, Leon Spencer) - 8:17

Personnel
Lou Donaldson - varitone alto saxophone, vocals
Blue Mitchell - trumpet
Charles Earland - organ
Jimmy Ponder - guitar
Leo Morris - drums

References

Lou Donaldson albums
1969 albums
Albums produced by Francis Wolff
Blue Note Records albums
Albums recorded at Van Gelder Studio